Xihongmen may refer to:

 Xihongmen Station, Beijing Subway, China
 Xihongmen, Beijing, in Daxing District, Beijing, China